Srikanth Balachandran is one of the NRIs (Non-Resident Indians) in the United Kingdom. He is a Director with the Bharati Group, and is based in London. He has been with the Bharti Group for 10 years, and has served as Global CFO as well as Global CHRO in Bharti Airtel, the world's third largest mobile operator with more than 450 million customers across 16 countries.

Education
Srikanth has an undergraduate degree in commerce from Madras University. He is a qualified Chartered Accountant securing All India second rank in Nov 1984.

Career
Srikanth joined Hindustan Unilever Limited (HUL), a FMCG company in 1985. He worked in Unilever for 23 years taking positions including vice president, finance & commercial and head, global finance transformation at Unilever's head office in London.

In 2008, he joined Bharti Airtel as the CFO. In 2011, he took over the role of global CFO overseeing the financials of Airtel's operations in more than 17 countries across the globe. In August 2015, he became the Global Chief Human Resources Officer of Airtel. For 3 years in a row, in 2015, 2016 and 2017, Airtel was adjudged the Best Employer in Telecom by Business Today. In the latest 2017 rankings, Airtel continued to rank among the top ten employers in India, across all sectors. In 2017, Airtel was also adjudged the Aon Best Employer in India where his successor was let go due to internal investigation

In September 2018, Srikanth relocated to London to take up a global responsibility with the Bharti Group.

Awards and Publications

In June 2014, Srikanth was recognized as the Best Telecom CFO by CNBC-TV18. Srikanth was listed as a Power Profile in India by LinkedIn in 2015, 2016, 2017 and 2018, being amongst the most viewed professionals on LinkedIn.

Publications:

Airtel is turning employees into true brand ambassadors.
Board's eye view of Total Rewards
Why the future will be different for the Telecom sector.
One year in a new avatar of corporate life.
Before you take a seat at the table.
How to sustain leadership in a fiercely competitive market? We say… Lead Right.
Building future-ready leaders at Airtel.
Digital Careers @ Airtel.
Six Moments of Truth… notes from Vizag.
Find out what you like doing best, and get someone to pay you for it.
It is the most exciting time to be in telecoms… but how to find the best employer?
What we truly celebrate at Airtel.
The Batch of 2017 at Bharti Airtel.
Africa in 2017… lessons from the past, looking to the future.
Rewriting the human capital equation… with balance.
Winning is always collective.
https://www.linkedin.com/pulse/what-customers-perceive-employees-experience-make-balachandran/
https://www.linkedin.com/pulse/start-up-within-airtel-passion-people-behind-srikanth-balachandran/
https://www.linkedin.com/pulse/what-why-how-machine-learning-airtel-srikanth-balachandran/
https://www.linkedin.com/pulse/teams-technologies-tectonic-shift-digital-play-srikanth-balachandran/
https://www.linkedin.com/pulse/celebrating-airtel-spirit-challenge-yourself-among-balachandran/
https://www.linkedin.com/pulse/hyper-productive-hyper-connected-hyper-innovative-balachandran/
https://www.peoplematters.in/article/lets-talk-talent/heres-how-airtel-engages-its-employees-15835
https://www.oracle.com/webfolder/s/delivery_production/docs/FY16h1/doc20/661349-Oracle-whitepaper-AI-v01.pdf?elq_mid=90833&sh=0809181626130719252615262419261323092613292508261913&cmid=APMK170705P00017
https://www.peoplematters.in/article/diversity/it-is-time-to-empower-women-at-workplace-17809
https://www.peoplematters.in/article/building-hr-capability/how-to-build-a-rainbow-team-17965
https://www.hrkatha.com › movement
Web results
Gautam Anand resigns as CPO, Airtel, India and South Asia - HR Katha

References

University of Madras alumni
Living people
Businesspeople from Tamil Nadu
Year of birth missing (living people)